Staley High School, located at 2800 N.E. Shoal Creek Parkway in Kansas City North, Missouri in the far north area of the district, is the fourth high school added to North Kansas City School District. The school was named after the nearby Staley Farms and the road of the same name. The opening began the year of 2008–09 classes, with nearly 1,000 students from Oak Park HS. It is the first Green school in Missouri; however, other schools are in the process of being built and/or planned. The school's mascot is the Falcons, and the school's colors are green, black, and silver. Staley's original principal Mr. Clark Mershon (lovingly nicknamed Papa Falcon) retired in June 2017 and was replaced by the current principal Dr. Larry Smith.

Facilities 
A new District Activities Complex (DAC) for district activities such as a football & track stadium, baseball and softball fields, a soccer field, a cross-country course, and tennis courts are behind the Staley campus. Staley High School has a student capacity of 1,500, but will increase to 2,000 following a future Phase II expansion.

Student activities 
In 2011, the Falcons won the Class Five Missouri State Football Championship by defeating the Kirkwood Pioneers 35–21 at the Edward Jones Dome in St. Louis, Missouri. They also won the state title in 2017, in Columbia, Missouri. They beat Pattonville 36–35 on a last second two point conversion. In 2012 and 2014, The Emeralds Dance Team also won the Class 4A Missouri State Dance Team Championship. The Staley Cross Country team has won conference titles on both the boys and girls sides and sent athletes to state. In 2015, the cross country team sent both boys and girls teams to state. The Wrestling Team won the State Champion title in 2017 against Park Hill High School, the then Number one ranked team in the state.  The Staley 2013–2014 Chamber Choir was selected as an MMEA State Choir, and traveled to Ireland for the World Choral Fest in 2013. State Championships and State rankings have been achieved by the choir, band, and orchestra, as well as regional and national awards for the STTV Broadcast program, the magazine, and school yearbook. The softball team also won the state championship in 2015 and went to states the following year. The baseball team has also made it to states several years. The golf team had several students do well the past few years as well.

Clubs and Activities 

 Anime Club                                              
 Art Club
 Asian Student Union
 Bowling Club
 Chess Club
 DECA
 Diversity Council
 Epsilon Beta Library Club
 Educators Rising
 ESports
 FCCLA
 FCA
 French Club
 FBLA
 Gaming Club
 Gender Sexuality Alliance
 HOSA
 Interact Club
 Mythology Club
 National English Honor Society
 National Honor Society
 Onyx Step Team
 ProStart Team
 Scholar Bowl
 Spanish Club
 Speech & Debate Club
 Robotics
 Student Council
 TSA
 Thespians
 Yoga & Mindfulness Club

References

External links
Staley High School
North Kansas City School District

High schools in Kansas City, Missouri
Educational institutions established in 2008
High schools in Clay County, Missouri
Public high schools in Missouri
2008 establishments in Missouri